Nestor Serrano (born November 5, 1955 in The Bronx, New York) is an American film and television actor. He is known for playing Navi Araz in the fourth season of 24. He also appeared as Emilio Loera in the fourth season of the Cinemax series Banshee.

Early life

Serrano studied at Queens College and the Lee Strasberg Theatre and Film Institute, both in New York City.

Career
Serrano began his acting career in off-Broadway plays in the late 1970s. He often portrays authority figures on both sides of the law. His first film was the 1986 Tom Hanks comedy The Money Pit. Since then, he has appeared in supporting roles in films such as Lethal Weapon 2, Bad Boys, The Negotiator, Empire, Secretariat, The Insider, Runaway Jury and The Day After Tomorrow.

He has an extensive television résumé, with appearances in shows such as Burn Notice, Homeland, Alias, Blue Bloods, and Law & Order and its spin-offs: SVU, Trial by Jury, and Criminal Intent.

Serrano is well known for playing Islamic terrorist Navi Araz in 24. He played Bobby's father on an episode of Ugly Betty. He played Victor, Adrianna Tate-Duncan's manager, on the CW show 90210. He made a guest-appearance on the Criminal Minds episode "Poison" as Det. Hanover, and he portrayed drug cartel leader Hector Estrada in Season 7 of the Showtime series Dexter. He played Carlos Solano, leader of the Solano Cartel in the USA show Graceland. In 2017, he played the psychiatrist Dr. Saul in the movie thriller Clinical.

Personal life
Serrano is of Puerto Rican descent.

Filmography

Films

References

External links
Official website

20th-century American male actors
21st-century American male actors
American male film actors
American male stage actors
American male television actors
Lee Strasberg Theatre and Film Institute alumni
Living people
Male actors from New York City
Place of birth missing (living people)
People from the Bronx
Queens College, City University of New York alumni
Year of birth uncertain
1955 births